Gor is a village in Mangan subdivision, North Sikkim district, Sikkim, India. The Ministry of Home Affairs has given it a geographical code of 260882.

References

Cities and towns in Mangan district